Sterna Linhas Aéreas was a cargo airline based in Curitiba, Brazil, founded in 2014. It operated cargo services.

Fleet
The Sterna Linhas Aéreas fleet consisted of a unique:

Accidents and incidents
21 October 2016: The Airbus A300-B4 registration PR-STN on a cargo flight between São Paulo-Guarulhos and Recife suffered a runway excursion after landing and the aft gear collapsed upon touchdown, in which the aircraft is still abandoned at airport after towed to coordinates 8°07'13.8"S 34°55'46.2"W, and then still in 8°07'27.3"S 34°55'37.1"W. The company ceased operations after this incident. No injuries were reported.

See also
List of defunct airlines of Brazil

References

Defunct airlines of Brazil
Airlines established in 2014
Airlines disestablished in 2017
2014 establishments in Brazil
2017 disestablishments in Brazil
Companies based in the Federal District (Brazil)